Roxanne Roxanne is a 2017 American musical drama film written and directed by Michael Larnell. It stars Chanté Adams, Mahershala Ali, Nia Long, Elvis Nolasco, Kevin Phillips and Shenell Edmonds. The film revolves around the life of rapper Roxanne Shante. It was screened in the U.S. Dramatic Competition section of the 2017 Sundance Film Festival.

Cast
 Chanté Adams as Roxanne Shante
 Taliyah Whitaker as young Roxanne 
 Mahershala Ali as Cross
 Nia Long as Peggy
 Elvis Nolasco as Ray 
 Kevin Phillips as Marley Marl
 Shenell Edmonds as Ranita
 Arnstar as MC Shan
 Nigel A. Fullerton as Biz Markie
 Tremaine Brown Jr. as Nasir
 Cheryse Dyllan as Sparky Dee
 Charlie Hudson III as Mr. Magic
 Cindy Cheung as Nurse Mitchell
 Sean Ringgold as Keith
 Nelsan Ellis as Mr. Lester

Release
In January 2017, Neon acquired distribution rights to the film. However, in December 2017, it was revealed that Netflix had won worldwide rights to the film.

Critical reception
On review aggregator website Rotten Tomatoes, the film holds an approval rating of 70% based on 30 reviews, and an average rating of 6/10. The website's critical consensus reads, "Roxanne Roxanne belatedly honors its subject with a gripping character-driven biopic that serves as a primer for a trailblazing career while telling an often tragic story." On Metacritic, the film has a weighted average score of 74 out of 100, based on ten critics, indicating "generally favorable reviews".

On RogerEbert.com, Nick Allen gave the film 2 stars. Comparing the movie to David O. Russell's Joy, he said: "Like Joy, this story feels overwhelmingly like the writer/director's version of their subject's lives, rendering Roxanne Roxanne a portrait that's as expressive as it is incomplete."

See also
List of black films of the 2010s

References

External links
 
 

2017 films
2017 drama films
2017 biographical drama films
2010s hip hop films
American biographical drama films
African-American films
English-language Netflix original films
African-American drama films
African-American biographical dramas
Films set in the 1980s
Films scored by RZA
Hood films
2010s English-language films
2010s American films